The 1997 Tour de Pologne was the 54th edition of the Tour de Pologne cycle race and was held from 7 September to 14 September 1997. The race started in Kołczygłowy and finished in Kraków. The race was won by Rolf Järmann of the Casino team.

Previous year's (1996) winner was Viatscheslav Djavanin (RUS).

General classification

References

1997
Tour de Pologne
Tour de Pologne